Meelick-Eyrecourt is a Gaelic Athletic Association club in the east of County Galway, Ireland,

History
Meelick-Eyrecourt GAA club was founded in Meelick in the 1880s, and contested the first all-Ireland hurling final in 1887. It borders with Killimor , Portumna and Kiltormer GAA clubs in Galway and St. Rynaghs in Banagher Co. Offaly.

The present club has players from the largely rural areas of Clonfert and Meelick, and the small village of Eyrecourt. These three areas make up the local Roman Catholic parish of Eyrecourt, Clonfert and Meelick, which is a small parish located on the south corner of the Diocese of Clonfert.

Meelick and Clonfert originally formed separate hurling teams. The Meelick club was founded in 1884. The existing club is sometimes cited as being one of the oldest GAA clubs in Ireland.

Meelick competed in the first All Ireland Hurling final of 1887 after defeating Kilbeacanty in the Galway County Cup. The club played opponents Thurles of Tipperary. Thurles defeated Meelick 1-1 - 0-0.

A book on the history of the club titled ‘A History of the GAA in Meelick, Eyrecourt and Clonfert, 1884-2007’, written by Christy Kearns, has been published by the club.

Recent activities
The club is primarily focussed on hurling while Gaelic football has been regarded as the club's second sport.

However, during the 1960s Meelick-Eyrecourt GAA club contested two Junior Gaelic football county finals at a time when Galway football was arguably at its height and at the same time the Galway senior football team won three all-Ireland finals in a row.

The club last contested a senior hurling county final in 1980, which it lost. The club has fluctuated between senior hurling and intermediate grades, which is similar to senior 'B' in other counties, since the late-1990s but has still continued to produce many inter-county Galway hurlers at all grades.

Alumni
A number of players who originally played with the Meelick-Eyrecourt club went on to play hurling for other counties, particularly Dublin, due to emigration in the 1940s and 1950s.

The former Meelick-Eyrecourt hurler Joe Salmon was named on the 'Galway team of the Millennium' at Mid-Field and was joined by fellow club member Sean Silke, who was named at Centre-Back.

Although the competition does not carry the same prestige as it once did, a number of the club's players who played senior hurling with County Galway were subsequently selected to represent Connacht in the annual Railway Cup interprovincial hurling competition.

Joe Salmon played a large part of his hurling career as a member of the Glen Rovers hurling club in Cork, where he worked and lived.

Former Galway minor hurler and Meelick-Eyrecourt player Niall Corcoran, from Clonfert, played on the Dublin senior hurling team and has played several times in the Leinster hurling championship. In 2011, he won a National Senior Hurling League medal with Dublin, playing corner back on the capital's team which defeated Kilkenny.

Sean Silke and Brendan Lynskey are holders of All-Star awards and both won All-Ireland hurling final winners medals with the Galway senior hurling panel in the 1980s. Sean Silke played at centre-half back on the Galway hurling team that won the all-Ireland final in 1980, and Brendan Lynskey was at full-forward and centre-forward respectively when Galway won the all-Ireland final in both 1987 and 1988.

Other players from the club have won underage all-Ireland medals at minor (under-18) and under-21 level. Players from the club have also won intermediate hurling all-Ireland medals.

A number of club players have played hurling for County Galway and a small number have played Gaelic football for County Galway. A number of players from Meelick-Eyrecourt GAA club have won All Ireland medals at senior and underage grades in hurling while playing for County Galway. Prior to the county's all-Ireland success in 2017, Galway had never won a senior hurling all-Ireland without a Meelick-Eyrecourt clubman on the panel. Club member Noel Larkin was involved with the team's management.

External links
Official Meelick-Eyrecourt GAA Club website

Gaelic games clubs in County Galway
Hurling clubs in County Galway